John William Aldridge (born 18 September 1958) is a former football player and manager. He was a prolific, record-breaking striker best known for his time with English club Liverpool in the late 1980s. His tally of 330 Football League goals is the sixth-highest in the history of English football.

During his early career, he worked his way up through the lower leagues, playing in every league from the old Fourth Division to the old First Division. Initially signed as a replacement for Ian Rush, Aldridge spent over two successful seasons at Liverpool, winning the league and FA Cup once, and narrowly missing out on a second league title. Aldridge spent two seasons at Real Sociedad, becoming the first non-Basque player to sign for the club in several decades as they abandoned their selective recruitment policy. In 1991, he returned to England to play for Tranmere Rovers, becoming their player-manager in 1996. He retired from playing and resigned as manager in 1998 and has not managed since.

A Liverpudlian by birth, he was recruited to play for the Republic of Ireland as part of Jack Charlton's "Granny Rule" policy: his great-grandmother was from Athlone, and travelled to Liverpool to settle in the 19th century. His career with Ireland coincided with their most successful period in international football, and he played at two World Cups.

Club career

South Liverpool and Newport County

Aldridge took a long time to reach the top level of the English game. He began his career in the mid-1970s at non-league South Liverpool, before getting his break in the professional game when, aged 20, he signed for Newport County in the Fourth Division on 2 May 1979 for £3,500.

While at Somerton Park, Aldo, as he came to be known, played 198 times scoring 87 goals, a goal every  games, including seven goals in twelve FA Cup matches. He partnered Tommy Tynan and Dave Gwyther for four years at Somerton Park, helping Newport to promotion from the Fourth Division and Welsh Cup glory in his first season, and to reach the quarter-finals of the European Cup Winners' Cup in his second.

His first season with County, 1979–80, saw him score fourteen goals from 38 games as his side won the Welsh Cup and gained promotion to the Third Division. A year later, he featured in the side that achieved a notable European run. In the league, he scored seven goals in 27 league games. He scored eleven goals in 36 games in the 1981–82 season, but in 1982–83 he did better still with seventeen goals from 41 games as County narrowly missed out on promotion to the second tier.

In 1983–84, with Tynan having departed, Aldridge had scored 26 times by the end of February, and County were still in the Third Division.

Oxford United
Alridge was sold to Oxford United on 21 March 1984, when the club was preparing for their Third Division promotion run-in under the management of Jim Smith. He made his debut on 7 April 1984, coming on as a substitute in a 1–0 win over Walsall at Fellows Park. His first goal was in the 5–0 home win against Bolton Wanderers on 20 April 1984.

He was used sparingly in the run-in to the Third Division title but the following season forged a partnership with Billy Hamilton and became the first Second Division player for nineteen years to score 30 goals. His 34 goals (30 in the league) in 1984–85 broke the club's goalscoring record for a single season,  as Oxford gained promotion to the old First Division for the first time. Aldridge also picked up a Second Division title medal.

In his 27th year, Aldridge finally had the chance to play in the First Division. He was the third-highest scorer in the division (only surpassed by Gary Lineker and Frank McAvennie) and netted six goals in United's League Cup-winning run in 1986 which culminated in a 3–0 victory over Queens Park Rangers in the final at Wembley. This is Oxford's only major trophy to date. His 23 goals from 39 games also assisted in Oxford avoiding relegation.

Aldridge ended up playing 141 times for Oxford, scoring 90 goals – a goal every 1.5 games – including fourteen League Cup goals in 17 ties. He scored four goals against Gillingham in the League Cup on 24 September 1986 and three hat-tricks, the first in the 5–2 victory over Leeds United on 24 November 1984. He also scored one of the two Oxford goals that defeated Manchester United in Alex Ferguson's first game as manager, on 8 November 1986, maintaining his fine form into the 1986–87 season.

Liverpool
In early 1987, Liverpool were losing striker Ian Rush to Juventus at the end of the 1986–87 season and needed a proven and experienced replacement. He signed for Kenny Dalglish's side on 27 January 1987 for £750,000 and was initially used as a partner for Rush (filling a position previously occupied by player-manager Dalglish and fellow striker Paul Walsh) and as an occasional substitute. Dalglish had been interested in signing a number of other strikers, including Chelsea's David Speedie and Arsenal's Charlie Nicholas, for a number of months before settling on Aldridge.

Liverpool ended the season trophyless, including a Wembley defeat to Arsenal in the League Cup final, for which Aldridge was ineligible. By the time of his transfer to Liverpool in that 1986–87 league campaign, Aldridge had already scored fifteen goals for Oxford in the space of 25 games.

Aldridge made his debut for the Reds on 21 February 1987, when he came on as a 46th-minute substitute for Craig Johnston in a 2–2 league draw with Aston Villa at Villa Park. His first goal for his new club came a week later on 28 February, in the 60th minute, the only goal of the game as Liverpool beat Southampton in a league match at Anfield.

Aldridge scored 26 goals in what turned out to be a successful season for Liverpool, including a strike in each of the first nine games, forming a 10-match scoring run as he had scored in his final league appearance of the previous season.

He linked up with new signings Peter Beardsley and John Barnes as Liverpool lost only twice in the League championship season and went unbeaten for the first 29 matches. Liverpool won the 1988 league title with two defeats all season and a nine-point lead over their nearest rivals Manchester United, although the gap between Liverpool and their nearest contenders was considerably wider for much of the season.

Aldridge scored both goals in the club's FA Cup semi-final against Nottingham Forest. With Wimbledon 1–0 up in the FA Cup final at Wembley, midway through the second half Liverpool were awarded a spot-kick when Aldridge himself was fouled, and he took the resulting penalty. Aldridge had scored all eleven of his penalty kicks that season, but goalkeeper Dave Beasant noticed that he always placed the ball to the keeper's left. Aldridge did, as predicted, place the penalty to Beasant's left, and the keeper sprang across to save it. He became the first goalkeeper to save a penalty in a Wembley FA Cup final. Aldridge's failure was his first penalty miss for Liverpool. He was substituted shortly afterwards as Liverpool lost 1–0.

The following season was tough and eventful for Aldridge. Rush failed to settle in Italy and Liverpool paid £2.8 million to bring him back to Anfield just before the season kicked off. Kenny Dalglish played Aldridge and Rush together. It was Aldridge who enjoyed the better form during the season, with Rush being hindered by injuries. In the Charity Shield match against Wimbledon at Wembley, Aldridge started the match and scoring both Liverpool goals in a 2–1 win. Aldridge maintained his scoring streak, often playing alongside both Rush and Beardsley in attack, while Rush missed a number of games or started games on the bench due to injuries. In the first league game of the season a week later, Aldridge scored a hat-trick in a 3–0 win at Charlton Athletic. He scored another league hat-trick on 14 March, in the 5–0 home win over Luton Town, which took his league tally for the season to fifteen goals. He reached the twenty-goal mark on 13 May in a 2–1 win at Wimbledon, and finished the season as the club's top scorer with 22 goals in the league, eight in the FA Cup, two in the League Cup, and two in the Charity Shield, amounting to 34 in all competitions.

In the 1989 FA Cup final at Wembley, against Merseyside rivals Everton, Aldridge made up for his penalty failure a year earlier by scoring after four minutes with his first touch of the ball. Substitute Ian Rish, who replaced Aldridge, scored twice in extra time to earn Liverpool a 3–2 victory. Aldridge scored 21 league goals that season, and 31 in all competitions, putting him among the highest scorers in the first division that season. The League and FA Cup "double", achieved by Liverpool in 1986 but denied to them by Wimbledon in 1988, was again possible, with a decider against Arsenal to come at Anfield. Aldridge played in a game which would guarantee Liverpool the title as long as Arsenal failed to win by two clear goals. 1–0 down in injury time, Liverpool conceded another goal to Michael Thomas with virtually the last kick of the season, thus losing the League title.

Aldridge played 104 times for Liverpool, scoring 63 goals, 50 of them in the league.

Real Sociedad
The following 1989–90 season, Kenny Dalglish reverted to a 4–4–2 formation with Rush and Beardsley as first-choice strikers; however, the club accepted an offer of £1 million from La Liga side Real Sociedad in early September 1989, with Aldridge having played twice in the league for Liverpool that season.

This transfer made Aldridge the first non-Basque player to sign for Sociedad in several decades as they abandoned a selective recruitment policy. Before he left Liverpool, he was given a special run-out as a substitute during the club's record-shattering 9–0 win over Crystal Palace in order to score a penalty in front of the Kop. He threw his shirt and boots into the crowd at the end and signed for Real Sociedad the next day on 13 September 1989.

Aldridge scored 40 goals in 75 appearances for Sociedad over two seasons, with the club encouraged to make more signings from English football in 1990, namely Dalian Atkinson and Kevin Richardson. Despite his success, some Sociedad fans initially did not accept him because he was a foreigner. Insulting graffiti was written on the stadium, a fan spat on the ground when Aldridge passed in the street, and his family found it hard to adapt to the different lifestyle in the Basque country. Aldridge handed in a transfer request in 1991 to the newly appointed manager John Toshack – another former Liverpool striker.

Tranmere Rovers
Aldridge returned to Merseyside on 11 July 1991 with Tranmere Rovers, in a £250,000 deal. While there he scored a club-record 40 goals in his first season at Prenton Park – scoring his 40th goal against former club Oxford United. Tranmere, who were playing in the Second Division for the first time in more than fifty years, achieved a mid-table finish in the league.

He made his debut for Rovers, aged 32, on 17 August 1991, scoring both the goals in a 2–0 victory over Brighton & Hove Albion at the Goldstone Ground. In seven years as a Tranmere player, he amassed a total of 294 appearances, scoring 174 goals, an average of one goal every 1.7 games, including 22 goals from 25 League Cup ties. Aldridge retired at the end of the 1997–98 season, scoring a brace in his final game as a professional against Wolverhampton Wanderers.

Aldridge's goals helped Tranmere reach their highest position ever in the league – top-six finishes in the second tier in 1993, 1994 and 1995 – which delivered playoff places each time, but all of them ended in semi-final defeats. He also came close to winning another major trophy as Rovers took Aston Villa to a penalty shoot-out in the 1993–94 League Cup semi-finals before bowing out to the eventual competition winners.

During his career in England alone, Aldridge played 739 games, scoring 411 times – an average of one goal every 1.8 games.

On 12 March 1996, with the resignation of John King after nine years as manager, Aldridge became player-manager of Tranmere, before finally giving up playing and concentrating on the management side two years later. In his first season in charge, Rovers finished the 1995–96 season in thirteenth place in Division One.

Under Aldridge, Tranmere reached the 2000 Football League Cup Final (which they lost to Leicester City) and consecutive FA Cup quarter-finals in 2000 and 2001. During the 2000 League Cup Final, Aldridge slapped the face of Leicester's Theo Zagorakis after he applauded the referee's decision to send off Clint Hill. The slap was seen by FA officials and he was charged with misconduct. Aldridge said of incident: "I felt he [Zagorakis] had disrespected Clint on one of the biggest occasions of his career so I slapped him". Tranmere were relegated into English football's third tier in 2001. Aldridge resigned in March 2001, just before Rovers' fate was sealed.

International career
Aldridge had already been recruited to play for the Republic of Ireland by the time he was approached by Liverpool at the start of 1987, qualifying through his grandmother, who was from Athlone. (When the Football Association of Ireland came looking for him they found out that Ray Houghton, who also played for Oxford at the time, was also eligible.) He made his debut on 26 March 1986 against Wales at Lansdowne Road in a 1–0 defeat. The match was the first under new manager Jack Charlton.

That summer, Aldridge played for the Irish side which had qualified, under Jack Charlton, for Euro 88 in West Germany, their first-ever major finals. They duly beat England 1–0, and drew 1–1 with the USSR, but went out of the competition after a defeat by eventual champions the Netherlands.	
Aldridge was struggling at international level at this time – he was playing well as a team performer, and Charlton was never unhappy, but it took him 20 matches to score his first international goal, which came against Tunisia at Lansdowne Road on 19 October 1988.

Aldridge withdrew himself from Ireland's World Cup qualifying tie with Spain at Lansdowne Road on 26 April 1989, as he felt unable to participate in the game due to his grief over the Hillsborough disaster. The game ended in a 1–0 win for Ireland. Aldridge finally scored his first goals at competitive level when he scored twice in a 2–0 win away over Malta, which sealed Ireland's qualification for the 1990 FIFA World Cup.

Aldridge played a crucial role in Ireland's path to the quarter-finals of the 1990 FIFA World Cup in Italy. Though he had finally opened his goal account for his country, he failed to score at the World Cup (although he had a goal disallowed in a 1–1 draw with the Netherlands) and Ireland lost to the host nation in the last eight. Aldridge played every game but was substituted in all of his five appearances.

Ireland failed to qualify for Euro 92, despite going through their group unbeaten. Aldridge scored three times in qualification, all 3 goals coming in Ireland's opening 5–0 win over Turkey at Lansdowne Road. Despite this setback, Aldridge helped Ireland to qualify for the 1994 World Cup: he scored 6 times in qualifying including a hat-trick in a 4–0 win over Latvia.

Aldridge's international career with Ireland is also remembered for an off-pitch incident at the 1994 FIFA World Cup. Trailing 2–0 to Mexico in a group game in Orlando, Florida, manager Charlton tried to send Aldridge on as a substitute but was delayed by a perceived sluggishness from the officials. Manager and player both launched expletive-laden tirades which were clearly heard by television viewers, with Aldridge having to be restrained from attacking the 4th official and a FIFA representative. Both were punished after the game, but when Aldridge finally was allowed on, after 6 full minutes of trying, he scored a goal to give Ireland a chance to get back into the game. Despite losing the game 2–1, Aldridge's goal was crucial in securing qualification for the second round.
All four teams in the group had finished with the same number of points and the same goal difference, Ireland's qualification was at the expense of Norway who had scored just one goal fewer.

Aldridge continued to play for Ireland in the qualifying stages of Euro 96. Despite a strong start to the group, Ireland failed to qualify. Aldridge scored twice in a 3–0 win away to Latvia in Ireland's opening game and was also on the scoresheet in a 4–0 away win against Northern Ireland. In Ireland's final home game of the group Aldridge scored twice against Latvia in a 2–1 win but Ireland failed to qualify after finishing second and losing a subsequent playoff to the Netherlands at Anfield in December 1995. Aldridge at this time was one goal short of the 20-goal record held by Frank Stapleton but, despite playing in the early stages of qualifying for the 1998 World Cup, he failed to score again to match the record and retired in 1996 to concentrate on managing Tranmere Rovers. His final game was a 3–0 against Macedonia on 9 October 1996 when he came on as a substitute.

Overall, Aldridge scored 19 goals in 69 matches spanning over a decade; 8 of his 19 goals came against Latvia.

Career after football
Aldridge is now a pundit with various media organisations – most notably with Radio City 96.7 where he summarises on the station's Liverpool commentaries home and away. He also continues to play in the Liverpool veterans' team. In 1998, he asked Hyder Jawad to ghost-write his autobiography. John Aldridge: My Story was published by Hodder & Stoughton the year after.

In 2006, he gained media celebrity in Ireland by appearing in RTÉ's Charity You're A Star competition. Despite not having a natural singing voice, Aldridge won the competition and in the process raised money for his nominated charity Temple Street Children's Hospital.

Aldridge was a crowd favourite everywhere he went, especially on Merseyside where being a local lad helped his cause. This was confirmed when a poll conducted by the official Liverpool Football Club website during the summer of 2006 placed him in 26th position. 110,000 Liverpool supporters worldwide took part in the poll named '100 Players Who Shook The Kop', where they were asked to name their favourite Reds of all time.

In March 2008, Aldridge took part in the autobiography audio CD series 60 minutes with John Aldridge. He spoke in depth about his career with 60 minutes presenter David Knight and later took part in a major signing session, signing 2000 copies of the CD in support of the Everyman appeal charity.

John Aldridge was allegedly involved in the News of the World hacking scandal in the mid-2000s. "They tell me I was hacked five or six years ago. I have no idea why they should go after me. I'm not exactly high profile."

Aldridge opened a Twitter account in March 2011. However, he was soon involved in angry exchanges with Manchester United supporters after referring to them as "scum", and eventually closed his account. A year later he revealed that he had returned to the site.

He is a regular contributor to match analysis and phone-in shows on LFC TV and also writes a column for the Sunday World and the Liverpool Echo.

Personal life 
When 96 Liverpool away fans were crushed to death in the Hillsborough disaster of 15 April 1989, during an FA Cup tie held in Sheffield against Nottingham Forest, Aldridge, as a native Liverpudlian and boyhood supporter of the club, was deeply affected by the tragedy. He attended the funerals of many of the victims, gave support to the injured and the bereaved, and publicly contemplated giving up the game.

Career statistics

Club

International

Scores and results list Republic of Ireland's goal tally first, score column indicates score after each Aldridge goal.

Honours

Player
Newport County
Welsh Cup: 1979–80

Oxford United
Football League Second Division: 1984–85
Football League Third Division: 1983–84
League Cup: 1985–86

Liverpool
Football League First Division: 1987–88
FA Cup: 1988–89
FA Charity Shield: 1988, 1989

Individual
PFA Team of the Year: 1991–92 Second Division, 1992–93 First Division, 1994–95 First Division
English Second Division top scorer: 1984–85
First Division top scorer: 1987–88; 1994–95, 1995–96
BBC Goal of the Season: 1987–88, 1988–89
FAI Senior International Player of the Year: 1992

Manager
Tranmere Rovers
League Cup runner-up: 1999–2000

See also 
 List of Republic of Ireland international footballers born outside the Republic of Ireland
 List of men's footballers with 500 or more goals

References

External links
 Profile at LFCHistory.net
 Thisisanfield.com Forgotten Heroes
 Official Liverpool FC profile at Liverpoolfc.tv

 John Aldridge index at Sporting-heroes.net 

1958 births
1990 FIFA World Cup players
1994 FIFA World Cup players
Association football forwards
English expatriate footballers
English expatriate sportspeople in Spain
English footballers
English people of Irish descent
Expatriate footballers in Spain
First Division/Premier League top scorers
Irish expatriate sportspeople in Spain
La Liga players
Liverpool F.C. players
Living people
Newport County A.F.C. players
Oxford United F.C. players
Singing talent show winners
Real Sociedad footballers
Republic of Ireland association footballers
Republic of Ireland expatriate association footballers
Republic of Ireland international footballers
Footballers from Liverpool
English Football League players
Tranmere Rovers F.C. players
UEFA Euro 1988 players
You're a Star contestants
FA Cup Final players
South Liverpool F.C. players